Wingham Park is a rugby league stadium in Greymouth, New Zealand. The ground is owned by the West Coast Rugby League.

History
Wingham Park is the home of rugby league on the West Coast and hosts the West Coast Rugby League grand final each year. It has hosted one test match, New Zealand against Great Britain in 1954. It is the smallest rugby league test venue in the world, holding 4000 people.

In 2006 the ground hosted the New Zealand national rugby league team again when they played the New Zealand Residents.

In 2011 the ground hosted the New Zealand Warriors where they played the Newcastle Knights in a National Rugby League warm up match. The game served as a fundraiser for the region after the Pike River Mine disaster.

References

External links
Wingham Park rugbyleagueproject.com
Wingham Park nzleague.co.nz

Rugby league stadiums in New Zealand
Buildings and structures in the West Coast, New Zealand
Sport in Greymouth